In number theory, the law of quadratic reciprocity, like the Pythagorean theorem, has lent itself to an unusually large number of proofs. Several hundred proofs of the law of quadratic reciprocity have been published.

Proof synopsis

Of the elementary combinatorial proofs, there are two which apply types of double counting. One by Gotthold Eisenstein counts lattice points. The shortest known proof also uses a simplified version of double counting, namely double counting modulo a fixed prime.

Eisenstein's proof 

Eisenstein's proof of quadratic reciprocity is a simplification of Gauss's third proof. It is more geometrically intuitive and requires less technical manipulation.

The point of departure is "Eisenstein's lemma", which states that for distinct odd primes p, q,
 
where  denotes the floor function (the largest integer less than or equal to x), and where the sum is taken over the even integers u = 2, 4, 6, ..., p−1. For example,
 
This result is very similar to Gauss's lemma, and can be proved in a similar fashion (proof given below).

Using this representation of (q/p), the main argument is quite elegant. The sum  counts the number of lattice points with even x-coordinate in the interior of the triangle ABC in the following diagram:

Because each column has an even number of points (namely q−1 points), the number of such lattice points in the region BCYX is the same modulo 2 as the number of such points in the region CZY:

Then by flipping the diagram in both axes, we see that the number of points with even x-coordinate inside CZY is the same as the number of points inside AXY having odd x-coordinates. This can be justified mathematically by noting that .

The conclusion is that
 
where μ is the total number of lattice points in the interior of AXY.

Switching p and q, the same argument shows that
 
where ν is the number of lattice points in the interior of WYA. Since there are no lattice points on the line AY itself (because p and q are relatively prime), and since the total number of points in the rectangle WYXA is
 
we obtain

Proof of Eisenstein's lemma 

For an even integer u in the range 1 ≤ u ≤ p−1, denote by r(u) the least positive residue of qu modulo p. (For example, for p = 11, q = 7, we allow u = 2, 4, 6, 8, 10, and the corresponding values of r(u) are 3, 6, 9, 1, 4.) The numbers (−1)r(u)r(u), again treated as least positive residues modulo p, are all even (in our running example, they are 8, 6, 2, 10, 4.) Furthermore, they are all distinct, because if (−1)r(u)r(u) ≡ (−1)r(t)r(t) (mod p), then we may divide out by q to obtain u ≡ ±t (mod p). This forces u ≡ t (mod p), because both u and t are even, whereas p is odd. Since there exactly (p−1)/2 of them and they are distinct, they must be simply a rearrangement of the even integers 2, 4, ..., p−1. Multiplying them together, we obtain
 
Dividing out successively by 2, 4, ..., p−1 on both sides (which is permissible since none of them are divisible by p) and rearranging, we have

On the other hand, by the definition of r(u) and the floor function,

and since p is odd and u is even,

implies that  and r(u) are congruent modulo 2.

Finally this shows that

We are finished because the left hand side is just an alternative expression for (q/p).

Addendum to the lemma

This lemma essentially states that the number of least residues after doubling that are odd gives the value of (q/p). This follows easily from Gauss' lemma.

Also,  implies that  and r(u) are either congruent modulo 2, or incongruent, depending solely on the parity of u.

where .

Proof using quadratic Gauss sums 
The proof of Quadratic Reciprocity using Gauss sums is one of the more common and classic proofs. These proofs work by comparing computations of single values in two different ways, one using Euler's Criterion and the other using the Binomial theorem. As an example of how Euler's criterion is used, we can use it to give a quick proof of the first supplemental case of determining   for an odd prime p: By Euler's criterion   , but since both sides of the equivalence are ±1 and p is odd, we can deduce that .

The second supplemental case  
Let , a primitive 8th root of unity and set . Since  and  we see that . Because  is an algebraic integer, if p is an odd prime it makes sense to talk about it modulo p. (Formally we are considering the commutative ring formed by factoring the algebraic integers  with the ideal generated by p. Using Euler's criterion, it follows that We can then say that But we can also compute  using the binomial theorem. Because the cross terms in the binomial expansion all contain factors of p, we find that . We can evaluate this more exactly by breaking this up into two cases 
 . 
 . 
These are the only options for a prime modulo 8 and both of these cases can be computed using the exponential form .

The general case 
The idea for the general proof follows the above supplemental case: Find an algebraic integer that somehow encodes the Legendre symbols for p, then find a relationship between Legendre symbols by computing the qth power of this algebraic integer modulo q in two different ways, one using Euler's criterion the other using the binomial theorem.

Let where  is a primitive pth root of unity. This is a quadratic Gauss sum. A fundamental property of these Gauss sums is that where . To put this in context of the next proof, the individual elements of the Gauss sum are in the cyclotomic field  but the above formula shows that the sum itself is a generator of the unique quadratic field contained in L. Again, since the quadratic Gauss sum is an algebraic integer, we can use modular arithmetic with it.

Proof using algebraic number theory 

The proof presented here is by no means the simplest known; however, it is quite a deep one, in the sense that it motivates some of the ideas of Artin reciprocity.

Cyclotomic field setup 

Suppose that p is an odd prime. The action takes place inside the cyclotomic field

where ζp is a primitive pth root of unity. The basic theory of cyclotomic fields informs us that there is a canonical isomorphism

which sends the automorphism σa satisfying  to the element  In particular, this isomorphism is injective because the multiplicative group of a field is a cyclic group: .
 
Now consider the subgroup H of squares of elements of G. Since G is cyclic, H has index 2 in G, so the subfield corresponding to H under the Galois correspondence must be a quadratic extension of Q. (In fact it is the unique quadratic extension of Q contained in L.) The Gaussian period theory determines which one; it turns out to be , where

At this point we start to see a hint of quadratic reciprocity emerging from our framework. On one hand, the image of H in  consists precisely of the (nonzero) quadratic residues modulo p. On the other hand, H is related to an attempt to take the square root of p (or possibly of −p). In other words, if now q is a prime (different from p), we have shown that

The Frobenius automorphism 

(The existence of such a Frobenius element depends on quite a bit of algebraic number theory machinery.)

The key fact about  that we need is that for any subfield K of L,

Indeed, let δ be any ideal of OK below β (and hence above q). Then, since  for any , we see that  is a Frobenius for δ. A standard result concerning  is that its order is equal to the corresponding inertial degree; that is,

The left hand side is equal to 1 if and only if φ fixes K, and the right hand side is equal to one if and only q splits completely in K, so we are done.

Now, since the pth roots of unity are distinct modulo β (i.e. the polynomial Xp − 1 is separable in characteristic q), we must have

that is,  coincides with the automorphism σq defined earlier. Taking K to be the quadratic field in which we are interested, we obtain the equivalence

Completing the proof 

Finally we must show that

Once we have done this, the law of quadratic reciprocity falls out immediately since

and

To show the last equivalence, suppose first that  In this case, there is some integer x (not divisible by q) such that  say  for some integer c. Let
 and consider the ideal  of K. It certainly divides the principal ideal (q). It cannot be equal to (q), since  is not divisible by q. It cannot be the unit ideal, because then

is divisible by q, which is again impossible. Therefore (q) must split in K.

Conversely, suppose that (q) splits, and let β be a prime of K above q. Then  so we may choose some

Actually, since  elementary theory of quadratic fields implies that the ring of integers of K is precisely  so the denominators of a and b are at worst equal to 2. Since q ≠ 2, we may safely multiply a and b by 2, and assume that  where now a and b are in Z. In this case we have

so   However, q cannot divide b, since then also q divides a, which contradicts our choice of  Therefore, we may divide by b modulo q, to obtain  as desired.

References 

Every textbook on elementary number theory (and quite a few on algebraic number theory) has a proof of quadratic reciprocity. Two are especially noteworthy:

 has many proofs (some in exercises) of both quadratic and higher-power reciprocity laws and a discussion of their history. Its immense bibliography includes literature citations for 196 different published proofs.

 also has many proofs of quadratic reciprocity (and many exercises), and covers the cubic and biquadratic cases as well. Exercise 13.26 (p 202) says it all
Count the number of proofs to the law of quadratic reciprocity given thus far in this book and devise another one.

External links
 F. Lemmermeyer's chronology and bibliography of proofs of the Quadratic Reciprocity Law (332 proofs)

Algebraic number theory
Article proofs